Aulani, a Disney Resort & Spa, is a beachside resort hotel at the Ko Olina Resort in Kapolei, Hawaii on the island of Oahu. Affiliated with the Disney Vacation Club, Aulani was the third Disney "stand-alone" hotel that is located in an area without any adjacent theme park. The others are Disney's Hilton Head Island Resort and Disney's Vero Beach Resort.

The word Aulani in Hawaiian can be loosely translated as "Orange" or "with deep messages". When the word is used as a name, it can mean "message from the chief".

The 21 acre Aulani opened to guests on August 29, 2011, with 359 hotel rooms and 460 time-share villas. A November 2018 report stated that at that time, there were 351 rooms (in two 15-story towers), including 16 suites and 481 villas, most being "2-bedroom-equivalent". An October 2018 review specified that there were three restaurants with seating (Makahiki, Ulu Cafe and 'AMA'AMA) and some smaller outlets serving snacks such as the Off the Hook poolside lounge.

History

Announced in October 2007, Disney unveiled the resort's name in January 2010. The project was estimated to cost $800 million and eventually generate about 1,000 jobs at the resort.  The project was managed by Disney Vice-president Djuan Rivers and designed by Joe Rohde of Walt Disney Imagineering.

The resort began timeshare sales on July 15, 2010, and began taking room reservations in August 2010.  On August 12, 2011, Disney suspended Aulani timeshare sales indefinitely and fired three executives, including Disney Vacation Club president Jim Lewis, after senior management realized the annual dues had been set too low to cover maintenance costs.

Timeshare sales were subsequently restarted although an October 2018 review was unable to exactly determine the total number of sales since 2010 due to gaps in published information.

In March 2019, the resort was named "Best Hotels/Accommodations – Luxury Accommodations" in the 2019 aio Media Hawaii Lodging & Tourism Awards.

Theme
Walt Disney Imagineering collaborated with Wimberly Allison Tong & Goo and Architects Hawaii Ltd. and cultural experts to design and construct what will celebrate the customs and tradition of Hawaii. The company also created an advisory council of Hawaiian elders to ensure great authenticity to Hawaiian culture.

A review in 2018 stated that "the modus operandi at Aulani is 'Big H, Little D,' as in: big emphasis on Hawaiian traditions and history, with just a little bit of Disney fairy dust sprinkled over the experience". Other reviews specified the Disney influence as including poolside visits by characters, Mickey-shaped foods, and character breakfasts and dinners. Characters that one could meet at the resort included (as of June 2017) Mickey Mouse, Minnie Mouse, Donald Duck, Daisy Duck, Goofy, Pluto, Chip 'n' Dale, Stitch from Lilo & Stitch, and Moana from the eponymous 2016 film. On February 14, 2021, Angel (Experiment 624) from the Lilo & Stitch franchise began making appearances at the resort, although socially distanced from guests as with all other characters at the time due to the COVID-19 pandemic in Hawaii.

When staff are hired, Hawaiian language skills are preferred for all jobs as part of the resort's plan to expose guests to the language of the land.

In July 2019, Forbes published a review by Laura Manske that emphasized the company's extensive use of Hawaiian culture, including art and architecture and the program that exposes youngsters to the "culture, art and music of Hawaii through interactive play." In her review, Manske commented: "There is both a dramatic and sublime sense of place here, as everything—from architecture to art, activities to aliments—at Aulani connects to a deeper meaning and embraces the people, places, past and present, art, music, dance and foods of Hawaii ... Aulani is not a theme park; it is a ... hideaway with just enough Disney-orchestrated animation and activity to add rhythm and variety to your vacation days.

Pu‘u Kilo & Water slides
Pu‘u Kilo is designed as a Volcano and consists of two slides: Volcanic Vertical - a Body water slide that leads into the Waikolohe Pool - and Tubestone Curl - a Tube water slide that ends up in the Waikolohe Stream.

References

External links

2011 establishments in Hawaii
Buildings and structures in Honolulu County, Hawaii
Disney Vacation Club
Hotel buildings completed in 2011
Hotels established in 2011
Hotels in Hawaii
Resorts in Hawaii
Tourist attractions in Honolulu County, Hawaii